Today Newspaper is an independent newspaper in the Gambia, West Africa. It was established July 2007 by Abdul Hamid Adiamoh, a Nigerian journalist. 

The newspaper was the first to publish colour on its front cover and in selected pages.

Newspapers published in the Gambia
Publications established in 2007